The old Cornish units of measurement were used in the 1700s and based on English measurements in their name and rough size, although had slight difference in their values.

Area 

Richard Carew's Survey of Cornwall (1602) says:
 

Cornish acre – 120 statute acres (or possibly 64), 8 score lease. Equal to 0.066 Acres.
Cornish ferling/farthing – ¼ a Cornish acre
Cornish lease – four sticks
Cornish stick – four yards, three yards square
Cornish Knight's fee – four Cornish acres
Cornish rod – 160 lace to a Cornish acre, 36sq. rods
Cornish lace – 18 ft square
Cornish land rod/lorgh – half a lace, 9 ft square

Length

Capacity

Mass

Fish

Sources

 Thornton B. Edwards, Cornish! a Dictionary of Phrases, Terms and Epithets Beginning with the word "Cornish", 2005.

Systems of units
Cornwall
History of Cornwall
Cornwall-related lists
Units of measurement by country